Khandie Khisses is a British burlesque performer, photographer and actor. Continually voted by the general public into the top 50 burlesque stars of 2009, 2010, and 2011 and 2012 as well as a top 20 UK Burlesque Performer. She is also a regular columnist for 21st Century Burlesque and Pinup America. She has also guest columned for BleedingCool.com. Khandie's first film Jimmy's End, written by comic book creator Alan Moore and directed by Mitch Jenkins was released in 2012. Her second film is 'His Heavy Heart' with Alan and Mitch again. Due for release Summer 2014.

Career
Having started her career in the Royal Air Force in 2004, she left to pursue a career as the glamour showgirl she is today. Originally called 'Morning Glory' though no records can be found, her stage name was changed to 'Khandie Khisses'. Her first performance was in late 2005 and since then has gone on to perform by invitation at the Zandra Rhodes Fashion & Textiles Museum, The British Science Festival, Australian Burlesque Festival and the Paris Burlesque Festival.

One of her more noted performances is her underwater mermaid art installation.

Already an accomplished writer her journalistic work features as regular columns for burlesque industry online magazine 21st Century Burlesque Online. She has previously written for Bleeding Cool  and Coochie Crunch.

References

External links
 Personal website

Year of birth missing (living people)
Living people
British neo-burlesque performers